Berma-ye Ashrostaq (also Romanized as Bermā-ye ‘Ashrostāq; also known as Bermā) is a village in Ashrestaq Rural District, Yaneh Sar District, Behshahr County, Mazandaran Province, Iran. At the 2006 census, its population was 97, in 30 families.

References 

Populated places in Behshahr County